Order of the Sun may refer to:

 Order of the Sun (Peru) (1821–present), the highest award bestowed by the Republic of Peru to commend notable civil and military merit and the oldest civilian award in the Americas.
 Order of the Sun (India), a knighthood bestowed by the Maharaja of Jaipur
 
 Order of the Sun (Persia) (1873–1925), an honor or decoration of the Kadjar dynasty, which maintained order in the late-19th century region which is now known as Iran
 Most Brilliant Order of the Sun, one of the Orders, decorations, and medals of Namibia

See also
 Order of the Rising Sun, Japan